Worms Eat My Garbage: How to Set Up & Maintain a Worm Composting System is a book by Mary Appelhof self-published in 1982 under the company name Flower Press. The book is still held as seminal reading in the field of vermicomposting.

Contents

The book gives instruction for vermicomposting (also called worm composting). It explains how to build, or where to buy, a bin for worm composting, each of the steps of converting garbage into fertilizer, and the uses of that fertilizer when the worms are finished with it.

Updates and other versions

The book has received many updated versions over the years. There is a similarly named version titled Worms Eat Our Garbage: Classroom Activities for a Better Environment, first published in 1993 and directed at classroom education. In 2017 Joanne Olszewski updated the book for a 35th anniversary edition, and in addition to Appelhof's work the new book contains information on invasive species and changes in recycling over the last two decades.

Author

Mary Appelhof was considered a pioneer in vermicomposting. She died on May 4, 2005.

References

External links
Worms Eat My Garbage 35th Anniversary Edition - Storey Publishing
Mary Appelhof's site for worm composting resources

1982 non-fiction books
1982 in the environment
Home composting